Habermaaß GmbH is a German toy manufacturing company (commonly referred to as HABA) based in Bad Rodach, Bavaria. The company defines itself as an “Inventor for inquisitive minds”, offering a broad selection of products such as wooden and textile toys, home furnishings and accessories for babies and children. Today the company is still a family run company, under the leadership of the managing partner Klaus Habermaaß and the managing director Harald Grosch.

History 
  
In 1938, Eugen Habermaaß and Anton Engel founded “Habermaaß & Co.” as a “factory for fine wooden products”, and a couple of months later  “Wehrfritz & Co." in cooperation with Karl Wehrfritz. In 1940, Anton Engel withdrew from the company, making Eugen Habermaaß its sole managing director. After his passing in 1955, his wife Luise Habermaaß took over the management of the company. At the same time, their son, Klaus Habermaaß, decided to start an apprenticeship in cabinetmaking. After finishing his engineering studies in 1961, Klaus became actively engaged in running the company, which grew and expanded in the following years.

The company began to expand in 1980 when the American company “Skaneateles Handicrafters” was purchased by Habermaaß Inc. In 1987, in order to expand their product range, the corporate family of HABA and Wehrfritz decided to found Jako-o GmbH, a joint mail-order company for children's fashion, toys and accessories. In 2002, the company received the definitive company name of “Habermaaß Corp. Inc.". In 1993, a subsidiary was founded in the French location of Evry near Paris under the name of “HABA S.A.R.L". In 2005, the “HABA UK” site was established in the United Kingdom.

Product range 
Since the company was founded in 1938, wooden toys have been a trademark of HABA. The company became known for its construction blocks. Over time, the product range has expanded: first incorporating other wooden toys, such as pulling figures, vehicles, clutching toys and a complex upgradeable ball track system, followed later by the first society games, such as “The Orchard”.

Even today the main focus of the company still lies in manufacturing out of wood. However, progressively different materials have been incorporated: with dolls and fabric animals, rugs, furniture for children's rooms and illumination articles finding their way into the product range.

Company sites and distribution areas 

Since it was founded in 1938, the company's production site has been located in the Upper Frankonian town of Bad Rodach. It is from here that all business and the daily activities of the different branch offices are monitored and directed. The company holds distribution branches in the US, France and the United Kingdom. Today the company is firmly established in both the European and world markets – with distribution areas stretching from Japan, Russia, the Near East and Europe to the Americas.

Awards 
Amongst the most prestigious awards that have been conferred on HABA are the Best Children's Game of the Year, the German Children's Games award, the Toy Innovation Award and the German Educational Game Award.

Best Children's Game of the Year
2000 – Pete the Pirate
2002 – Highly Suspect
2003 – Shiver-Stone Castle
2005 – Akaba
German Children's Games award
2001 – Klondike
2006 – The Black Pirate
2010 – Dragon Diego Dart
Toy Innovation Award2005 – AkabaGerman Educational Game Award
2006 – Big Cheese2007 – Said and done!2018 – Kullerbü – Car Park-Play Track As d'Or Jeu de l'Année Enfant (Children's Games)
 2017	– Go CuckooMany HABA playthings have also been designated with the "Spiel Gut" ('Good Toy') stamp.Karuba, one of HABA's strategy board games, was nominated for the 2016 Spiel des Jahres award.Kullerbü'', HABA's car park play track game, was one of the winners of 2018 The Toy Award: Gold for toys awards.

References

External links 
 HABA
 HABA USA
  - pdf of awards available from the As d'Or Award page

Manufacturing companies of Germany
Manufacturing companies established in 1938
Toy companies of Germany
Wooden toys
Board game publishing companies
Design companies established in 1938
Toy companies established in 1938
German companies established in 1938